Albert M. Hemeon (1843 – April 26, 1896) was a merchant and political figure in Nova Scotia, Canada. He represented Queen's County in the Nova Scotia House of Assembly from 1887 to 1896 as a Liberal member.

He was born in Shelburne, Nova Scotia, of United Empire Loyalist descent, and educated at Truro. In 1864, he married L.W. McVicar. Hemeon was a school trustee, a justice of the peace and warden for Queen's County. He was first elected in an 1887 by-election held after Jason M. Mack resigned his seat. Hemeon died in office.

References 
The Canadian parliamentary companion, 1891 JA Gemmill

1843 births
1896 deaths
Nova Scotia Liberal Party MLAs
Canadian justices of the peace